Ioan Giurgiu Patachi (or , 1680–1727) was Bishop of Făgăraș and Primate of the Romanian Greek Catholic Church from 1721 to his death in 1727.

Life
Ioan Giurgiu Patachi was born from a family of small nobility in Strâmbu, Cluj County in 1680. Orphan, he was raised by his uncle who left him in the Jesuits' care. He studied in Cluj, Vienna and later he was sent to the German and Hungarian College of Rome where he remained from 1705 to 1710. In Rome, on 24 September 1707, he was ordained a Roman Rite priest. After graduation, he served as Latin priest in Făgăraș.

The first Greek Catholic Bishop of Romania, the bishop of Alba Iulia, Atanasie Anghel, died on 19 August 1713, and his succession was problematic. At first the Synod of the Church elected a Jesuit, Francisc Szunyogh, who refused. Later the Synod elected the former secretary of Atanasie, Venceslav Franz, but this selection was opposed by the Habsburg monarch, the Emperor Charles VI, because Franz was a lay. Finally on 23 December 1715 a consensus was reached on the name of Patachi.

The way to his formal enthronement was still long. On 14 February 1717 he entered in the Basilian Order, and he had to petition the Vatican for the change of liturgical rite to the Byzantine Rite. Moreover the Latin bishop of Alba Iulia opposed to presence of a Greek Catholic diocese in the same town, and the monastery in Alba Iulia, where the Greek Catholic Romanian Church was based, had to be demolished to give place to a fortress. Actually it was only on 3 February 1721 that Patachi was formally confirmed by Pope Clement XI and on 18 May 1721 the See was moved to Făgăraş, thus founding the Greek Catholic Diocese of Făgăraș. His enthronement occurred in the Cathedral of St. Nicholas in Făgăraș on 17 August 1723.
 
He died a few years later, on 29 October 1727 in Sâmbăta de Jos, Brașov County.

Notes

1680 births
1727 deaths
Primates of the Romanian Greek Catholic Church
Order of Saint Basil the Great
17th-century Romanian people
18th-century Eastern Catholic bishops
18th-century Romanian people